Kevin Reynolds was the Western Australian state secretary for the Construction, Forestry, Mining and Energy Union (CFMEU). Prior to this he was involved with the Builders Labourers Federation in the 1970s and 1980s where he formed an association with Norm Gallagher.

Reynolds held considerable influence in the centre-right faction of the Western Australian branch of the Australian Labor Party and is closely associated with former premier, Brian Burke.

Personal life
Reynolds' partner is former Western Australian MLC, Shelley Archer.

Further reading

 Bartley, John. (1992) Kevin Reynolds - biography of BLF State Secretary The B.L., March 1992, p. 25-27
 Broome Advertiser. (2005) Kevin Reynolds buys five-bedroom home in Broome. Broome advertiser, 27 October 2005, p. 5
 Flint, John. (2000) After 25 years it's win or bust for big Kev. Sunday times, 12 November 2000
 Kelly, Jim. (1997) No rest for hard man of building. Sunday times (Perth, W.A.), 20 July 1997, p. 9
 Kennedy, Debra. (2004) A bark worse than his bite. Australian, 12 April 2004, p. 4
 Reynolds, Kevin. (1997) A rally to remember.(Protest rally against Third Wave Industrial reforms, 29 April 1997). W.A. construction worker, Winter 1997, p. 4-7

See also
 Solidarity Park

People from Perth, Western Australia
Australian trade unionists
Living people
Year of birth missing (living people)